The 2015 New York Cosmos season was the new Cosmos' third season of existence, playing in the new North American Soccer League. Including the previous franchise, this is the seventeenth season of a club entitled New York Cosmos playing professional soccer in the New York metropolitan area.

Club

Roster
.

Competitions

Pre-season and Exhibitions

Pre-season

Exhibitions

Friendlies goal scorers

NASL Spring Season 

The Spring season lasted for 10 games beginning on April 4 and ending on June 13. The schedule featured a single round robin format with each team playing every other team in the league a single time.

Standings

Results

Results by round

Match reports

NASL Fall Season 

The Fall season lasted for 20 games beginning on July 12 and ending on November 1. The schedule featured a double round robin format with each team playing every other team in the league twice, one at home and one on the road.

Standings

Results

Results by round

Match reports

The Championship

U.S. Open Cup 

The Cosmos competed in the 2015 edition of the Open Cup, entering in the Third Round of the tournament.

Match reports

Squad statistics

Appearances and goals

|-
|colspan="14"|Players who appeared for the New York Cosmos who are no longer at the club:

|}

Goal scorers

Own goal scorers

Disciplinary record

Transfers

In

Out

Loan in

Loan out

References 

New York Cosmos (2010–) seasons
New York Cosmos
New York Cosmos
Cosmos